In physics and mathematics, the solid harmonics are solutions of the Laplace equation in spherical polar coordinates, assumed to be (smooth) functions . There are two kinds: the regular solid harmonics , which are well-defined at the origin and the irregular solid harmonics , which are singular at the origin. Both sets of functions play an important role in potential theory, and are obtained by rescaling spherical harmonics appropriately:

Derivation, relation to spherical harmonics 

where  is the square of the nondimensional angular momentum operator,

It is known that spherical harmonics  are eigenfunctions of :

Substitution of  into the Laplace equation gives, after dividing out the spherical harmonic function, the following  radial equation and its general solution,

The particular solutions of the total Laplace equation are regular solid harmonics:

and  irregular solid harmonics:

The regular solid harmonics correspond to harmonic homogeneous polynomials, i.e. homogeneous polynomials which are solutions to Laplace's equation.

Racah's normalization
Racah's normalization (also known as Schmidt's semi-normalization) is applied to both functions 

(and analogously for the irregular solid harmonic) instead of normalization to unity. This is convenient because in many applications the Racah normalization factor appears unchanged throughout the derivations.

Addition theorems
The translation of the regular solid harmonic gives a finite expansion,

where the Clebsch–Gordan coefficient is given by

The similar expansion for irregular solid harmonics gives an infinite series,

The quantity between pointed brackets is again a Clebsch-Gordan coefficient,

The addition theorems were proved in different manners by several authors.

Complex form
The regular solid harmonics are homogeneous, polynomial solutions to the Laplace equation . Separating the indeterminate  and writing , the Laplace equation is easily seen to be equivalent to the recursion formula

These are the complex solid harmonics:

and in general

Real form

By a simple linear combination of solid harmonics of  these functions are transformed into real functions, i.e. functions .  The real regular solid harmonics,  expressed in Cartesian  coordinates, are real-valued homogeneous polynomials of order  in x, y, z. The explicit form of these polynomials is of some importance. They appear, for example, in the form of spherical atomic orbitals and real multipole moments. The explicit Cartesian expression of the real regular harmonics will now be derived.

Linear combination 

We write in agreement with the earlier definition 

with

where  is a Legendre polynomial of order .
The  dependent phase is known as the Condon–Shortley phase.

The following expression defines the real regular solid harmonics:

and for :

Since the transformation is by a unitary matrix the normalization of the real and the complex solid harmonics is the same.

z-dependent part 

Upon writing  the -th derivative of the Legendre polynomial can be written as the following expansion in 

with

(x,y)-dependent part 

Likewise

Further

and

In total

List of lowest functions 

We list explicitly the lowest functions up to and including .
Here 

References

Partial differential equations
Special hypergeometric functions
Atomic physics
Fourier analysis
Rotational symmetry